Sürmenespor, is the football team of Sürmene near Trabzon, Turkey.

The club was founded at 13 July 1967 and played in the TFF Third League 1999–2000 and 2006–2010.

Kits
The clubs plays in green and white kits.

Stadium
Currently the team plays at the 1165 capacity İsmet Gürbüz Civelek Stadium.

League participations
TFF Third League: 1999–2000, 2006–2010
Turkish Regional Amateur League: 2010–2011
Trabzon Amateur League: 1967–1999, 2011–

References

External links
  Soccerway profile
  Sportstats profile

Sport in Trabzon
Football clubs in Turkey
Association football clubs established in 1967
1967 establishments in Turkey